The Where Do We Go? World Tour was the fifth concert tour by American singer Billie Eilish, in support of her debut studio album When We All Fall Asleep, Where Do We Go? (2019). The tour commenced on March 9, 2020 in Miami, Florida at American Airlines Arena and concluded prematurely on March 12, 2020 in Raleigh, North Carolina at PNC Arena. It was planned to conclude on September 7, 2020 in Jakarta, Indonesia at Indonesia Convention Exhibition, before Eilish cancelled future shows because of the COVID-19 pandemic.

Background and development 
The name of this tour essentially finishes the name of the previous tour (When We All Fall Asleep Tour), of which the same album was promoted. The tour was officially announced through Eilish's Instagram account on September 27, 2019. Eilish posted a picture along with the tour dates and venues. Then, on February 28, 2020, Eilish announced Jessie Reyez as the support act for North America and European dates.

Eilish was planned to embark on a sold-out North American tour in March 2020 and was set to tour South America and Europe before heading to Asia. On March 16, 2020, Eilish announced the postponement of her North American tour due to the COVID-19 pandemic, and on May 13, 2020, Eilish announced the postponement of the remainder of the tour for the same reason. On December 3, 2020, Eilish announced that the tour would be officially cancelled and gave fans a full refund, while also informing them that they'll be granted new tickets for her next tour.

Set list 
This set list is from the concert on March 9, 2020 in Miami. It is not intended to represent all shows from the tour.

"Bury a Friend"
"You Should See Me in a Crown"
"My Strange Addiction"
"Ocean Eyes"
"Copycat"
"When I Was Older"
"8"
"Wish You Were Gay"
"Xanny"
"The Hill" 
"Lovely"
"Listen Before I Go"
"I Love You"
"Ilomilo"
"Bellyache"
"Idontwannabeyouanymore"
"No Time to Die"
"When the Party's Over"
"All the Good Girls Go to Hell"
"Everything I Wanted"
"Bad Guy"
"Goodbye"

Tour dates

Cancelled shows

Notes

References 

2020 concert tours
Concert tours of Europe
Billie Eilish concert tours
Concert tours of North America
Concert tours of South America
Concert tours cancelled due to the COVID-19 pandemic